Richelieu—Verchères was a federal electoral district in Quebec, Canada, that was represented in the House of Commons of Canada from 1935 to 1968.

This riding was created in 1933 from parts of Chambly—Verchères, Richelieu, St. Hyacinthe—Rouville and Yamaska ridings.

It was abolished in 1966 when it was redistributed into Chambly, Richelieu and Saint-Hyacinthe ridings.

Members of Parliament

This riding elected the following Members of Parliament:

Election results

|National Unity
|Adrien Arcand
|align=right|5,590

|Radical chrétien
|Rolland Corbeil
|align=right|1,089

See also 

 List of Canadian federal electoral districts
 Past Canadian electoral districts

External links 
 Riding history from the Library of Parliament

Former federal electoral districts of Quebec